C/2016 R2 (PanSTARRS) is a comet, discovered using the Pan-STARRS telescopes on September 7, 2016. The comet attracted attention from many astronomers as it approached its closest point to the sun in May 2018. It has been observed to have a very complex tail, which has been suggested to be due to a fast rotation period of the nucleus.

The comet orbits the Sun on a 20,000 year orbit, which takes it out about 740 AU (Sun-Earth distances). It was found to differ from typical comets, and was found to be rich in Carbon monoxide (CO) with a blue coma. The blue color is thought to come from the rich amounts of carbon monoxide being ionized. The comet was also noted to be rich in nitrogen.

The comet was observed by a submillimeter wavelength telescope in the late 2010s.

The comet made its closest approach to the Sun in May 2018, and its blue, teal, and dust tail were noted as an astronomical target. Blue comets are a less common type of comet.

Gallery

See also
2I/Borisov
Comet Morehouse
Comet Humason

References

External links 
 Comet C/2016 R2 (PanSTARRS) Information | TheSkyLive.com 

Cometary object articles
Non-periodic comets
Comets in 2016
20160907
Discoveries by Pan-STARRS